The Olney Transportation Center, also called Olney Terminal, is a SEPTA bus and subway station in Philadelphia, Pennsylvania. It is located at the intersection of Broad Street and  Olney Avenue in the Logan neighborhood of North Philadelphia. It is a major bus terminal as well as the last subway stop on the Broad Street Line before the Fern Rock Transportation Center terminus.

Olney Transportation Center is located near Einstein Medical Center Philadelphia, La Salle University, Central High School, and the Philadelphia High School for Girls. The Olney neighborhood is a short distance east of the center; the center's name derives from Olney Avenue, which runs through both Olney and Logan. It is the second-most traveled terminal or transportation center in SEPTA's organization.

Station layout

History 
Originally built in 1928, Olney station was the northern terminus of the Broad Street Line subway until 1956, when it was extended to the Fern Rock Transportation Center. The underground subway station is accessible from both sides of Broad Street including from the bus terminal on the eastern side of the street and has a food stand inside it. The bus terminal is outdoors with a roof on top and serves buses that serve Philadelphia County, Montgomery County, and Bucks County. It also served as a trolley terminal until January 11, 1986 for Ogontz Avenue's Route 6, and was near Sigler Travel, a former Greyhound Lines bus station. Express and local trains both stop at this station. It has two island platforms, one for the two northbound tracks, and one for the two southbound tracks.

On February 18, 2021, three unidentified gunmen opened fire at the station at 2:50 pm, wounding eight people, one very seriously. The ages of victims ranged from 17 to 71. Its motive is generally unknown to authorities and those involved.

Image gallery

References

External links 

SEPTA Broad Street Line stations
SEPTA stations and terminals
Railway stations in the United States opened in 1928
Transportation buildings and structures in Philadelphia
Railway stations in Philadelphia
Olney-Oak Lane, Philadelphia
Railway stations located underground in Pennsylvania